Girelli is an Italian surname. Notable people with the surname include:

Coyle Girelli, English musician
Cristiana Girelli (born 1990), Italian footballer
Leopoldo Girelli (born 1953), Italian archbishop, Vatican diplomat
Sebastiano Girelli (born 1984), Italian footballer

Italian-language surnames